St Paul's College is a Catholic primary and secondary school, located in Gilles Plains, in the north-eastern suburbs of Adelaide, South Australia.

Education 
The school was founded by the Congregation of Christian Brothers in 1958. The school is a member of Edmund Rice Education Australia, with an enrolment of approximately 850 students.

Since 2013, the school has catered for students in reception to year 12. In 2022, the school will become coeducational. The school has specialty facilities for arts, music, ICT and technology, as well as offering over 40 subjects.

Students are enrolled into houses. In 2020, the houses included: 

 Dally House (Tony Dally)
 Gleeson House (Father James Gleeson)
 Marlow House (Wilf Marlow)
 O'Loughlin House (named for a family who were neighbours to the school)
 Nagle House (Honora “Nano” Nagle)

Each year, Year 4 and above go on a unique camp to experience nature. These camps range from a Zoo-Snooze (Sleeping at the Adelaide Zoo) to a Mounting Biking Adventure, where students bring and cook their own meals.

Principals

Notable alumni 

 Nathan Arkley2012 Paralympic bronze medalist
 Thomas Dengfootball player
 Iain Fyfeformer Adelaide United FC and Sydney FC player
 Stefan GiroAustralian rules footballer

 Doc Neesonlead singer and frontman of the band, The Angels
 Stuart O'Gradycyclist and Olympic gold medalist
 Ryan SchoenmakersAustralian rules footballer
 Sean WellmanAustralian rules footballer

See also

 List of schools in South Australia
 List of Christian Brothers schools
 Catholic education in Australia

References

External links
St Paul's College Website

Boys' schools in South Australia
Congregation of Christian Brothers secondary schools in Australia
Educational institutions established in 1958
Catholic secondary schools in Adelaide
Catholic primary schools in Adelaide
1958 establishments in Australia
Congregation of Christian Brothers primary schools in Australia